Morcombelake (also spelled Morecombelake) is a small village near Bridport in Dorset, England, within the ancient parish of Whitchurch Canonicorum. Golden Cap, part of the Jurassic Coast World Heritage Site, is nearby.

References

External links 
Parish Church of St Gabriel

Villages in Dorset